The language icon is a specific icon designed for people to select a specific language to use when they face multi-lingual, multi-national websites.


Description 
The icon, referred to as "Turnstile Icon", is an abstract representation of a turnstile or a revolving door with a script-like 文 and a sans-serif A combined with an arrow that indicates movement.

History 
The initial Language icon was designed by Onur Mustak Cobanli and his team in 2008 when they planned to build a multi-lingual, multi-national website, taking the form of a tongue symbol. After the first language icons were rejected, the design contest was organized by A’ Design Award & Competition. Farhat Datta designed the winning entry, “Turnstile Language Icon”, created in 2011, and announced as the winner in 2012.

License 

Its website says it is under an unnamed "CC license"; however, this is actually a vanity license, not one of the officially released Creative Commons licenses, and three of the four terms do not match any in the CC suite. Therefore, use of the Creative Commons name is contrary to a best practice. The described license is 'Semi-Noncommercial' and restricts what modifications derived versions can make for aesthetic reasons, so it is not a free license since not all of the Four Freedoms are guaranteed, and likewise does not provide all of the freedoms of the Creative Commons Share-Alike licenses (such as CC-BY-SA).

Instead, the license for the license icon has the following conditions:

 Relax-Attribution. You are suggested but not required to attribute the work when using for internet / digital use. You must attribute it in any other use which is not on internet. Attribute to: A’ Design Award & Competition, Onur Müştak Çobanlı and Farhat Datta with URL http://www.languageicon.org for non-internet usage.
 Share Alike. If you alter, transform, or build upon this work, you may distribute the resulting work only under the same or similar license to this one, attribute to original author, resulting work cannot be commercial.
 Semi-Noncommercial. You may not use this work as a central element (or one of the core elements) for commercial purposes; Such as a design on a t-shirt, on a book cover etc unless you attribute to the author. On the other hand you can use freely in your websites without attribution to signify language.
 Color-Friendly: You can change the colors as you like, keep the form intact please; scale proportionally. You can reverse the color or grayscale it if required.

Font Awesome and Google 

The language icon was adopted into the widely-used "Font Awesome" icon package in Font Awesome version 4 in 2014. Font Awesome version 5 abandoned the language icon, replacing it with a plain A and 文 symbol for language selection in 2018.

Google Translate has had a G and 文 symbol since January 2015.

See also 
Flag icons for languages

References 

User interfaces
Language interpretation